In September 2016, the International Union for Conservation of Nature (IUCN) listed 343 near threatened mammalian species. Of all evaluated mammalian species, 6.2% are listed as near threatened. 
The IUCN also lists 31 mammalian subspecies as near threatened.

Of the subpopulations of mammals evaluated by the IUCN, one species subpopulation and one subspecies subpopulation have been assessed as near threatened.

This is a complete list of near threatened mammalian species and subspecies evaluated by the IUCN. Species and subspecies which have near threatened subpopulations (or stocks) are indicated. Where possible common names for taxa are given while links point to the scientific name used by the IUCN.

Odd-toed ungulates
Species

Subspecies

Primates
Species

Subspecies

Cetartiodactyls
Cetartiodactyla includes dolphins, whales and even-toed ungulates. There are 31 species, eight subspecies, one subpopulations of species, and one subpopulations of subspecies of cetartiodactyl assessed as near threatened.

Non-cetacean even-toed ungulates
There are 26 species and eight subspecies of non-cetacean even-toed ungulate assessed as near threatened.

Suids
Species
Celebes warty pig
Subspecies
Sus barbatus oi

Deer species

Subspecies
Alaska moose

Bovids
Species

Subspecies

Cetaceans
Species

Subpopulations of species
Bowhead whale (1 subpopulation)
Subpopulations of subspecies
Northern blue whale (1 subpopulation)

Marsupials
There are 41 marsupial species assessed as near threatened.

Diprotodontia

Shrew opossums
Gray-bellied caenolestid
Long-nosed caenolestid

Microbiotheria
Monito del monte

Dasyuromorphia

Opossums

Carnivora
Species

Subspecies
Atlantic walrus

Afrosoricida

Eulipotyphla

Lagomorpha

Rodents
There are 106 rodent species assessed as near threatened.

Hystricomorpha

Myomorpha
There are 63 species in Myomorpha assessed as near threatened.

Murids

Cricetids

Spalacids
Balkan mole-rat
Kazakhstan blind mole-rat

Dipodids

Castorimorpha

Sciuromorpha
There are 25 species in Sciuromorpha assessed as near threatened.

Sciurids

Dormice
Garden dormouse

Cingulata

Bats
There are 79 bat species assessed as near threatened.

Megabats

Microbats
There are 63 microbat species assessed as near threatened.

Old World leaf-nosed bats

Horseshoe bats

Vesper bats

Leaf-nosed bats

Other microbat species

Other mammal species

See also 
 Lists of IUCN Red List near threatened species
 List of least concern mammals
 List of vulnerable mammals
 List of endangered mammals
 List of critically endangered mammals
 List of recently extinct mammals
 List of data deficient mammals

References 

Mammals
Near threatened mammals
Near threatened mammals
Mammal conservation